The Diocese of Cleveland is a Latin Church ecclesiastical territory, or diocese, of the Catholic Church in northeastern Ohio in the United States.  , the  bishop is Edward Malesic. The Cathedral of St. John the Evangelist, located in Cleveland, is the mother church of the diocese.

The Diocese of Cleveland is a suffragan diocese in the ecclesiastical province of the metropolitan Archdiocese of Cincinnati.

Territory 
The Diocese of Cleveland is currently the 17th-largest diocese in the United States by population, encompassing the counties of Ashland, Cuyahoga, Geauga, Lake, Lorain, Medina, Summit, and Wayne.

History

Early history 
During the 17th century, present day Ohio was part of the French colony of New France. The Diocese of Quebec, had jurisdiction over the region. In 1763, Ohio Country became part of the British Province of Quebec, forbidden from settlement by American colonists. After the American Revolution, the Ohio area became part of the new United States.  For Catholics, Ohio was now under the jurisdiction of the Archdiocese of Baltimore, which then comprised the entire country.

In 1808. Pope Pius VII erected the Diocese of Bardstown in Kentucky, with jurisdiction over the new state of Ohio along with the other midwest states. Pope Pius VII on June 19, 1821, erected the Diocese of Cincinnati, taking the entire state of Ohio from the Diocese of Bardstown.

Diocese of Cleveland

1840 to 1870 
Pope Pius IX erected the Diocese of Cleveland on April 23, 1847, with territory taken from the Archdiocese of Cincinnati. At that point, the diocese included counties going west to Toledo, Ohio, and south to Youngstown, Ohio. He named Reverend Louis Rappe as the first bishop of Cleveland.

When Rappe took office, the diocese contained 42 churches and 21 priests; the first and only Catholic church in Cleveland was St. Mary's on the Flats. He soon established the city's first parochial school, which doubled as a chapel.

Rappe purchased an episcopal residence in 1848, founding a seminary there.  He laid the cornerstone of St. John's Cathedral in 1848.  In 1849, Rappe went to Europe to recruit clergy for the diocese.  He returned in 1850 with four priests, five seminarians, two Sisters of Charity and six Ursuline nuns. The Daughters of the Immaculate Heart of Mary opened St. Mary's Orphan Asylum for Females in 1851. Rappe consecrated St. John's Cathedral on November 7, 1852.  The Sisters of Charity opened St. Vincent's Asylum for Boys in 1852.  He also introduced the Grey Nuns to the diocese in 1856.

In 1865, Rappe established St. Vincent Charity Hospital, the first public hospital in Cleveland. He brought in the Good Shepherd Sisters (1869), the Little Sisters of the Poor (1870), the Friars Minor (1867) and the Jesuits (1869), and organized the Sisters of Charity of St. Augustine as a new congregation. Rappe retired in 1870 after 33 years as bishop of Cleveland.

1870 to 1900 
In 1872, Pope Pius IX appointed Reverend Richard Gilmour of the Archdiocese of Cincinnati as the second bishop of Cleveland.  As bishop, Gilmour founded The Catholic Universe newspaper in 1874. In 1877, the Cuyahoga County auditor announced plans to tax Catholic churches and schools.  Gilmour fought the auditor in court, winning his case six years later. He was also wary of the public school system. He established St. Ann's Asylum and Maternity Home, St. Michael Hospital, and St. John Hospital.In 1882, Gilmour condemned the Ladies Land League chapter in Cleveland.. Founded in Ireland, the League was a women's organization that assisted tenants being evicted from their homes.After Gimour died in 1891, Pope Leo XIII named Reverend Ignatius Horstmann of the Archdiocese of Philadelphia as the new bishop of Cleveland.

Horstmann founded the following institutions in the diocese:

 Loyola High School in Cleveland (1902),
 St. John's College in Toledo (1898),
 St. Anthony Home for Working Boys in Cleveland.
 The Catherine Horstmann Home in Cleveland for homeless women.

In the early 1890's, Horstmann faced a schism within the Diocese of Cleveland.  Polish parishioners at St. Stanislaus Parish in Cleveland, led by Reverend Anton Kolaszewski, were demanding more control over their parish and more sensitivity to their customs. Despite Horstmann's refusal, Kolaszewski continued to press for independence and accused the bishop of sexual abuse crimes.  In 1892, Horstmann relieved Kolaszewski of his post.  When the new pastor arrived at St. Stanislaus Church for his first mass, a brawl broke out among the parishioners.  In 1894, a group of  parishioners started a new independent parish, Immaculate Heart of Mary, with Kolaszewski as pastor; Horstmann excommunicated all of them.  Years later, after the deaths of both men, the diocese accepted the new church.

1900 to 1945 
In 1907, Horstmann faced a second schism with Polish Catholics.  After removing Reverend Casimir Zakrekac as pastor of St. Vitus Parish in Cleveland, he faced violent protests.  After the parish rectory was stoned, the replacement priest was forced to flee.  Over 100 people were arrested.  On September 22, 1907, 5,000 Polish protesters marched on Horstmann's residence, demanding Zakrekac's reinstatement and home rule for St. Vitus.  Horstmann died in 1908.

Pope Pius IX named Reverend John Farrelly of the Diocese of Nashville as bishop of Cleveland in 1909. The next year, Pius IX erected the Diocese of Toledo, removing the Toledo area counties from the Diocese of Cleveland.  During his 12-year-long tenure as bishop, Farrelly improved the parochial school system; organized Catholic Charities; and erected 47 churches and schools, including Cathedral Latin High School in Chardon, Ohio. During World War I, Farrelly was appointed by Cleveland Mayor Harry L. Davis to the Cleveland War Commission. Farrelly also ordered English to be spoken at all German language churches and schools in the diocese.Farrely served as bishop until his death in 1921.

Bishop Joseph Schrembs of the Diocese of Toledo was appointed bishop of Cleveland in 1921 by Pope Pius XI. In 1925, the pope presented the relics of St. Christine to Schrembs.  Christine, a 13 year-old girl who died for her Catholic faith around 300 AD, was moved from the Roman catacombs to St. John's Cathedral in Cleveland.  The diocese had previously donated money to the Vatican for the establishment of the House of Catacombs outside Rome. During his tenure, Schrembs erected 27 parishes in Cleveland and 35 outside the city. In 1942, as Schrembs' diabetes worsened, Pope Pius XII named Bishop Edward Hoban from the Diocese of Rockford as Schrembs' coadjutor bishop to help him with his duties.In 1943,  Pius XII erected the Diocese of Youngstown. taking counties from the Youngstown area away from the Diocese of Cleveland.

1945 to 1980 
After Schrembs died in 1945, Hoban automatically succeeded him as bishop of the Diocese of Cleveland. As bishop, Hoban encouraged refugees displaced by World War II to settle in Cleveland. He also established national and ethnic parishes, but insisted that their parochial schools only teach in English. He helped rebuild and remodel St. John's Cathedral, and enlarged St. John's College, both in Cleveland. Hoban centralized Parmadale Family Services, constructed additional nursing homes, and opened Holy Family Cancer Home in Parma, Ohio, a hospice for cancer patients. Hoban opened a minor seminary and expanded the Newman Apostolate for Catholic students attending public universities and colleges.During Hoban's 21-year-long tenure, the number of Catholics in the diocese increased from 546,000 to 870,000. Hoban also established 61 parishes, 47 elementary schools, and a dozen high schools. Pope Paul VI appointed Bishop Clarence Issenmann of the Diocese of Columbus as coadjutor bishop of the Diocese of Cleveland on October 7, 1964.When Hoban died in 1966, Issenmann automatically became his replacement in Cleveland.

As bishop, Issenmann constructed the following schools in the diocese:

 Villa Angela Academy in Cleveland,
 Lake Catholic High School in Mentor
 Lorain Catholic High School in Lorain
 St. Vincent-St. Mary High School in Akron

In November 1968, Issenmann asked all adults attending mass in the diocese to sign petitions of support for Humanae vitae, Pope Paul VI's 1969 encyclical against artificial birth control.  Issenmann was the only bishop in the country to make that request of parishioners. issenmann retired in 1974 due to poor health. Pope John Paul II in 1974 named Auxiliary Bishop James Hickey of the Diocese of Saginaw as the new bishop of Cleveland. Six years later, in 1980, the pope named him as archbishop of the Archdiocese of Washington.

1980 to present 
John Paul II appointed Auxiliary Bishop Anthony Pilla to replace Hickey as bishop of Cleveland in 1980. In 2005, 36 lay members of the diocese sued Pilla, accusing him of allowing $2 million in diocesan funds to be stolen.  The judge dismissed the lawsuit, saying that the plaintiffs did not have the legal standing to sue in this case. After 26 years as bishop, Pilla resigned in 2006.

On April 5, 2006, Pope Benedict XVI named Auxiliary Bishop Richard Lennon of the Archdiocese of Boston as the tenth bishop of the Diocese of Cleveland. In May 2008, the now retired Pilla testified for the prosecution in the embezzlement trial of Joseph Smith, the assistant treasurer for the Diocese of Cleveland.  Smith had been accused of stealing $784,000 from the diocese through a kickback scheme with an accomplice. Smith's lawyers claimed that Pilla and other diocesan clergy were guilty of that theft. Pilla said that in 2004 he had received an anonymous letter accusing Smith of theft.  After meeting with Pilla, Smith went on administrative lead and later resigned. In his testimony, Pilla praised Smith and said that he left the financial management of the diocese up to him.  Smith was acquitted of embezzlement, but convicted of tax evasion; he received one year in prison. Lennon resigned in 2016 due to poor health.

Pope Francis in 2017 appointed Auxiliary Bishop Nelson J. Perez of the Diocese of Rockville Centre to replace Lennon. Three years later, the pope name Perez as archbishop of the Archdiocese of Philadelphia. The current bishop of Cleveland is Bishop Edward C. Malesic of the Diocese of Steubenville, named by Francis in 2020.

Parish closings
On, March 14, 2009, the Diocese of Cleveland announced the closing or merging of 52 parishes (29 parishes closing, 42 parishes merging to form 18 new parishes).  The reasons given were the shortage of priests, the declining numbers of parishioners in some parishes, the migration of Catholics to the suburbs, and the financial difficulties of some parishes. A number of parish schools were also to be closed or merged due to declining enrollment, and financial difficulties.The hardest hit were urban parishes in Cleveland, Akron, Lorain, and Elyria. Parishioners from 13 of the affected urban parishes appealed the decision to the Congregation for the Clergy in Rome.

On March 8, 2012, the Congregation for the Clergy overturned all 13 of the contested urban parish closings because Lennon did not follow proper procedure or canon law.  He should have first consulted with his priest advisors and also issued a formal mandate for the parish closings and mergers. The Congregation ordered the reopening of the parishes. On April 10, 2012, Lennon announced that he would not appeal the Vatican decision. The 13 parishes reopened on June 10, 2012, raising the number of parishes in the diocese from 172 parishes to 185 parishes.

Reports of sex abuse
In March 2002, Bishop Pilla published a list of 28 priests accused of sexual abuse of minors.  Fifteen of them were 15 active priests, whom Pilla suspended from ministry.  Earlier that year, Cuyahoga County Prosecutor William Mason announced an investigation of sexual abuse of minors by diocesan priests.

In July 2011, an Ohio man sued Pilla and the diocese, saying that their negligence allowed a priest to sexually abuse him when he was a boy. The plaintiff claimed that Patrick O’Connor, a diocesan priest at St. Jude Parish in Elyria, Ohio, abused him from 1997 to 1999.  Pilla knew that O'Connor had previously abused a child at  St. Joseph Parish in Cuyahoga Falls, Ohio.  The diocese had settled with that victim and sent O'Connor to Elyria.  O'Connor pleaded guilty to corruption of a minor in 2009.

In July 2019, the diocese added 22 more names to its list of "credibly accused" clergy. In December 2019, Reverend Robert McWilliams, a diocesan priest, was arrested at St. Joseph Parish in Strongsville, Ohio, on four counts of possessing child pornography. Bishop Perez had called for McWilliams' arrest, describing the case as a "painful situation." Along with being charged with possessing child pornography, McWilliams was  charged with one count of possessing criminal tools. By January 2020, McWilliams now had a total 21 counts of possessing child pornography. Federal child pornography exploitation charges were also filed against McWilliams in July 2020.

Statistics 
As of 2017, the Diocese of Cleveland had a population of approximately 677,219 Catholics and contained 185 parishes, 22 Catholic high schools, three Catholic hospitals, three universities, two shrines (St. Paul Shrine Church and St. Stanislaus Church), and two seminaries (Centers for Pastoral Leadership). The diocese has 258 active priests and 1,035 sisters.

Bishops

Bishops of Cleveland
 Louis Amadeus Rappe (1847–1870)
 Richard Gilmour (1872–1891)
 Ignatius Frederick Horstmann (1891–1908)
 John Patrick Farrelly (1909–1921)
 Joseph Schrembs (1921–1945), appointed Archbishop ad personam by Pope Pius XII in 1939
 Edward Francis Hoban (1945–1966; coadjutor bishop 1942–1945), appointed Archbishop ad personam by Pope Pius XII in 1951
 Clarence George Issenmann (1966–1974; coadjutor bishop 1964–1966)
 James Aloysius Hickey (1974–1980), appointed Archbishop of Washington (Cardinal in 1988)
 Anthony Michael Pilla (1980–2006)
 Richard Gerard Lennon (2006–2016)
 Nelson Jesus Perez (2017–2020), appointed Archbishop of Philadelphia
 Edward Charles Malesic (2020–present)

Auxiliary Bishops of Cleveland
 Joseph Maria Koudelka (1907–1911), appointed Auxiliary Bishop of Milwaukee and later Bishop of Superior
 James A. McFadden (1922–1943), appointed Bishop of Youngstown
 William Michael Cosgrove (1943–1968), appointed Bishop of Belleville 
 John Raphael Hagan (1946)
 Floyd Lawrence Begin (1947–1962), appointed Bishop of Oakland 
 John Joseph Krol (1953–1961), appointed Archbishop of Philadelphia (Cardinal in 1967)
 Clarence Edward Elwell (1962–1968), appointed Bishop of Columbus 
 John Francis Whealon (1961–1966), appointed Bishop of Erie and later Archbishop of Hartford
 Gilbert Ignatius Sheldon (1976–1992), appointed Bishop of Steubenville 
 Michael Joseph Murphy (1976–1978), appointed Bishop of Erie 
 James Anthony Griffin (1979–1983), appointed Bishop of Columbus
 James Patterson Lyke O.F.M. (1979–1990), appointed Archbishop of Atlanta
 Anthony Michael Pilla (1979–1980), appointed Bishop of Cleveland
 Anthony Edward Pevec (1982–2001) 
 Alexander James Quinn (1983–2008)
 Martin John Amos (2001–2006), appointed Bishop of Davenport
 Roger William Gries, O.S.B. (2001–2013)
 Michael Gerard Woost, (2022-present)

Other affiliated bishops
Additionally, the following bishops began their priestly ministry as priests of the Diocese of Cleveland (the years in parentheses refer to their years in Cleveland):
 John Patrick Carroll, Bishop of Helena (1889–1904)
 Augustus John Schwertner, Bishop of Wichita in 1921 (1897–1910)
 Thomas Charles O'Reilly, Bishop of Scranton (1898–1927)
 Edward Mooney, titular Archbishop and Apostolic Delegate, and later Archbishop (ad personam) of Rochester and Archbishop of Detroit (Cardinal in 1946) (1909–1926)
 Charles Hubert Le Blond, Bishop of Saint Joseph (1909–1933) 
 Michael Joseph Ready, Bishop of Columbus (1918–1944) 
 John Patrick Treacy, Coadjutor Bishop and later Bishop of La Crosse (1918–1945)
 Joseph Patrick Hurley, Bishop of Saint Augustine (and Archbishop (ad personam) in 1949) (1919–1940)
 John Francis Dearden, Coadjutor Bishop and later Bishop of Pittsburgh and Archbishop of Detroit (Cardinal in 1969) (1932–1948) 
 Paul John Hallinan, Bishop of Charleston and later Archbishop of Atlanta (1937–1958) 
 Raymond Joseph Gallagher, Bishop of Lafayette in Indiana (1939–1965) 
 Timothy P. Broglio, Apostolic Nuncio to the Dominican Republic and later Archbishop for the Military Services, USA (1977–2001)
 David John Walkowiak, Bishop of Grand Rapids (1979–2013)
 Neal James Buckon, Auxiliary Bishop for the Military Services, USA (1995–2011)

Churches

High schools
A listing of all Catholic high schools within the Diocese.  Note: Some schools are private, i.e., not operated by the Diocese.
Archbishop Hoban High School, Akron/Summit County (Co-ed), (Holy Cross)
Beaumont School, Cleveland Heights/Cuyahoga County (Girls), (Ursuline)
Benedictine High School, Cleveland/Cuyahoga County (Boys), (Benedictine)1941
Cleveland Central Catholic High School, Cleveland/Cuyahoga County (Co-ed)1969, (Diocese of Cleveland)
Elyria Catholic High School, Elyria/Lorain County (Co-ed), (Diocese of Cleveland)
Gilmour Academy, Gates Mills/Cuyahoga County(Co-ed), (Holy Cross), (Boarding School)
Holy Name High School, Parma Heights/Cuyahoga County (Co-ed), (Diocese of Cleveland)
Lake Catholic High School, Mentor/Lake County (Co-ed), (Diocese of Cleveland)
Magnificat High School, Rocky River/Cuyahoga County (Girls), (Sisters of the Humility of Mary)
Notre Dame-Cathedral Latin School, Chardon/Geauga County (Co-ed), (Sisters of Notre Dame)
Our Lady of the Elms High School, Akron/Summit County (Girls), (Sisters of St. Dominic)
Padua Franciscan High School, Parma/Cuyahoga County (Co-ed/Cuyahoga County), (Franciscan) 1961
St. Edward High School, Lakewood/Cuyahoga County (Boys), (Holy Cross)
St. Ignatius High School, Cleveland/Cuyahoga County (Boys) (Jesuit) 1886
St. Joseph Academy, Cleveland/Cuyahoga County (Girls), (Congregation of the Sisters of St. Joseph)
Saint Martin de Porres High School, Cleveland/Cuyahoga County (Co-Ed), (Jesuit, Sisters of the Humility of Mary, Cristo Rey)
St. Vincent–St. Mary High School, Akron/Summit County (Co-ed), (Marianist)
Trinity High School, Garfield Heights/Cuyahoga County (Co-ed), (Sisters of St. Joseph of the Third Order of St. Francis)1973.
Villa Angela-St. Joseph High School, Cleveland/Cuyahoga County (Co-ed).(Diocese of Cleveland)
Walsh Jesuit High School, Cuyahoga Falls/Summit County (Co-ed), (Jesuit)

Closed schools
Nazareth Academy, Parma Heights/ Cuyahoga County (Girls),(Congregation of the Sisters of St. Joseph 1957-1980). Closed in 1980, Holy Name High School moved in to its building that year.
Regina High School, South Euclid/Cuyahoga County (Girls), (Sisters of Notre Dame), 1953-2010
St. Peter Chanel High School, Bedford/Cuyahoga County (Co-ed)(Marist Fathers 1957-1973); (Diocese of Cleveland 1973-2013). Closed 2013
St. Augustine Academy, Lakewood/Cuyahoga County (Girls) Closed 2005.  Now Lakewood Catholic Academy elementary school.
Lorain Catholic High School, Lorain/Lorain County (Co-ed) Closed 2004.

See also

Historical list of the Catholic bishops of the United States
List of the Catholic dioceses of the United States
St. Peter Catholic Church (Norwalk, Ohio)

References

External links

Roman Catholic Diocese of Cleveland official website

 
Cleveland
Cleveland
Religious organizations established in 1847
Culture of Cleveland
Cleveland
Christianity in Cleveland
1847 establishments in Ohio